The 1903 Washington & Jefferson football team was an American football team that represented Washington & Jefferson College as an independent during the 1903 college football season.  Led by second-year head coach William B. Seaman, the team compiled a record of 6–4.

Schedule

References

Washington and Jefferson
Washington & Jefferson Presidents football seasons
Washington and Jefferson Red and Black football